Wales One World Film Festival, also known as WOW Film Festival, is an annual film festival that takes place in the Aberystwyth Arts Centre in Aberystwyth, Wales, UK. It is the longest-running British film festival of world cinema.

History
The Wales One World Film Festival was founded in 2001 by David Gillam, and in that year screened at three venues: Aberystwyth Arts Centre, the Taliesin in Swansea, and Chapter in Cardiff. His vision was to present world cinema in a way that "show[s] the stories people ‘over there’ are telling each other, what is important to them".

In 2014 the festival screened at Chapter Cardiff, Aberystwyth Arts Centre, Theatr Mwldan Cardigan, and Clwyd Theatr Cymru Mold. In that year, WOW collaborated with Aberystwyth's Abertoir (subtitled "The International Horror Festival of Wales") for the UK premiere of the Argentinian supernatural thriller The Second Death (La Segunda Muerte). Other films screened in that year included The Lunchbox ; Metro Manila from the Philippines; Delight (one of a trilogy by Welsh director Gareth Jones); Kenyan drama Nairobi Half Life; and the Swiss documentary Winter Nomads.

In 2015, the festival included films Argentinian film Natural Sciences (Ciencias naturales); the documentary Deep Listening, about Australian eco-communities; the international collaboration Jauja, starring Viggo Mortensen; and films from  India, Ethiopia, Mauritania and Brazil There was also a day of Iranian films to celebrate Nowruz (Iranian new year, celebrated on the northern spring equinox.

In 2017, the festival opened on 17 March in Cardiff then toured to Aberystwyth, Swansea, Cardigan and Mold, screening films from Argentina, Chile, Colombia, Mali, Palestine, Thailand and Nepal. Films included Pablo Larrain's Neruda; documentary feature Tomorrow (Demain) (2015, Cyril Dion); feature documentary on the arms trade Shadow World; and many others.

The 20th edition in 2021 was presented online, owing to the COVID-19 pandemic. All films were presented free to view. Peter Wohlleben's film The Hidden Life of Trees had its UK premiere at the festival. Other films included Bhutan documentary Lunana: A Yak in the Classroom; feelgood comedy Arab Blues; Malaysian horror film Roh; and the 1974 Iranian classic The Deer. The festival concluded on 21 March, celebrating the International Day of Forests.

The 2022 event, which ran from 25 February to 13 March, was the 21st edition of the festival, making it the longest-running festival of world cinema in the UK. Over half the films were UK online premieres.

Description
The festival is supported by Ffilm Cymru Wales, the BFI's Festivals Fund (which provides funding from The National Lottery), Arts Council of Wales, and(in 2021) the Welsh Government's Cultural Recovery Fund. It is dedicated to world cinema, screening films mostly from Africa, Asia and Latin America, aiming to show under-represented national cinema industries. Its specialised programming allows for "visionary cinema" to be screened in a way that regular circuits do not allow.

The artistic director  is founding director David Gillam, who was also inaugural director of Borderlines Film Festival from 2003 to 2013. The filmmaker Clive Myer, founder of three film schools, was a director of the festival as of 2012.

The Abertoir festival, Iris LGBT+, and Native Spirit Festival are partner festivals of WOW. A selection of short films made by Welsh emerging filmmakers, under the banner of Ffilm Ifanc, are premiered in a section called Made in Wales.

Climate Stories
The Bangladesh Cymru Climate Stories film project is a collaborative project between Dhaka DocLab in Bangladesh, and Wales One World Film Festival, focused on making films about climate change. The British Council is funding the project to the tune of £74,995. Four short films "on the theme of women building sustainability and resilience in response to climate change issues" will be selected from entries by filmmakers aged 18–35, two each from Bangladesh and Wales. The winning entries will be shown at the 2023 WOW Film Festival.

References

External links

Aberystwyth
Film festivals in Wales
2001 establishments in Wales